The 1968–69 DDR-Oberliga season was the 21st season of the DDR-Oberliga, the top level of ice hockey in East Germany. Eight teams participated in the league, and SG Dynamo Weißwasser won the championship.

First round

Final round

Qualification round

References

External links
East German results 1949-1970

DDR-Oberliga (ice hockey) seasons
Ober
Ger
1968 in East German sport
1969 in East German sport